Miss World Spain 2017 was the 5th edition of the Miss World Spain pageant, held on September 16, 2017. The winner was Maria Elisabeth Tulián Marín of Balearic Islands and she represented Spain in Miss World 2017. This was the first edition of Miss World Spain under the Nuestra Belleza España after the gained the franchise the previous year after the Be Miss Organization gave up the license to focus solely on Miss Universe Spain.

Final results

Placements

Challenge Events

Beauty with a Purpose

Multimedia

Top Model

Sports

Talent

Swimsuit

Regional Costume

Judges
Fran Fajardo, journalist from the Canary Islands 7
Mireia Lalaguna Royo , Miss World Spain 2015 and Miss World 2015
Susana de la Llave Varón, Miss Spain World 1988 and 4th Runner-Up of Miss World 1988

Official Delegates

Notes

Did not compete
 Aragón
 Ceuta
 Galicia

References

External links

Miss Spain
2017 in Spain
2017 beauty pageants